Nemeiben Lake is a hamlet in north central SaskatchewanCanada, located on Nemeiben Lake. Part of the lake including the hamlet is located within the Lac La Ronge Provincial Park. It is 2 km from Lac la Ronge and 24 km from the town of La Ronge.

Nemeiben Lake is a popular camping destination, with a campground that is set in a coniferous forest on the shore of the lake. There is a scenic 1.5 km interpretive walking trail.

Fish species in the lake include walleye, sauger, yellow perch, northern pike, lake trout, rainbow trout, burbot, lake whitefish, cisco, white sucker and longnose sucker.

References

External links 
 Lac La Ronge Provincial Park

Division No. 18, Unorganized, Saskatchewan
Unincorporated communities in Saskatchewan